This is a list of islands of Africa.

Sovereign island nations

Indian Ocean

Union of the Comoros
Grande Comore
Anjouan
Mohéli

Republic of Madagascar
Île Sainte-Marie (also known as Nosy Boraha)
Nossi-Bé

Republic of Mauritius

Mauritius island
Rodrigues island
Agaléga Islands
Saint Brandon

Republic of Seychelles

Inner Islands:
La Digue
Félicité
Marianne
Grande Soeur
Petite Soeur
Ile aux Cocos
Ile la Fouche
Silhouette Island
Ile du Nord
Les Mamelles
Ile aux Récifs
Frégate
L'Ilot
Ile aux Vaches
Vache Marine
Chauve Souris
Roche Canon
Les Trois Dames
Cocos Dans Trou
Bird Island
Ile Denis (Denis Island)
Mahé
Praslin
Sainte Anne
Ile Ronde
Moyenne Island
Therese
Roche Tortue
Ile Du Suete
Conception
Ile Hodoul
Coco Dans Milieu
Ile Longue
Ile Malice
L'Islette
Roche Bouquet
Baleise Island
Beacon Island
Roche Grande Maman
Cousin
Cousine
Zave
Aride
Ile Seche
Ile Cachee
Cerf Island
Ile Aux Rats
Souris
Capucins
Ile De La Police
Ilot Lascar
Grosse Roche
Reclaimed Island
*Grande Rocher
Anonyme Island
Curieuse
St. Pierre Island, Farquhar
St. Pierre Island, Praslin
Faon
Bastille Island
Bonhomme Island
Bonnefemme Island
Lazare Islet
Grosse Roche
L'Amour Island
Ile Consolation
Matelot Island
Maquereau Island
Roche Du Sud
Takamaka Island
Ile Madge
Pointe Cocos
Ile Zanguille
Kittery Island
Parasole Island
Ile De La Farine
Ilot Capitaine
Severe Island
Cabris Island
Roche Babri
Cipaille Island
Caimant Island
Bonne Carre Island
Brizare Rock
Brule
Outer Islands:
Ile Plate
Coëtivy
Amirantes Group:
Rémire
D'Arros
Desroches
Sand
Etoile
Boudeuse
Marie-Louise
Desnoeufs
African Banks:
Bancs Africains
Ile du Sud
St. Joseph's Atoll:
St. Joseph
Ile aux Fouquets
Resource
Petit Carcassaye
Grand Carcassaye
Benjamin
Bancs Ferrari
Chiens
Pélicans
Vars
Residence Island
Ile Paul
Banc de Sable
Bancs aux Cocos
Ile aux Poules
Poivre Atoll:
Poivre
Florentin
Ile du Sud
Alphonse and St. François Atolls:
Alphonse Island
Bijoutier
St François
Farquhar Group
Farquhar Atoll:
Ile du Nord
Ile du Sud
Manahas Nord
Manahas Milieu
Manahas Sud
Ile aux Goëlettes
Lapins
Ile du Milieu
Déposés
Bancs de Sable
Providence Atoll:
Providence
Bancs Providence
St. Pierre
Cerf Island
Aldabra Group
Aldabra Atoll:
Grande Terre
Picard
Polymnie
Malabar
Ile Michel
Ile Esprit
Ile aux Moustiques
Ilot Parc
Ilot Emile
Ilot Yangue
Ilot Magnan
Ile Lanier
Champignon des Os
Euphrates Islet
Grand Mentor
Grand Ilot
Green Rock
Gros Ilot Gionnet
Gros Ilot Sésame
Heron Rock
Hide Island
Ile aux Aigrettes
Ile aux Cèdres
Iles Chalands
Ile Fangame
Ile Héron
le Michel
Ile Suacco
Ile Sylvestre
Ile Verte
Ilot Déder
Ilot du Sud
Ilot du Milieu
Ilot du Nord
Ilot Dubois
Ilot Macoa
Ilot Marquoix
Ilots Niçois
Ilot Salade
Middle Row Island
Noddy Rock
North Row Island
Petit Mentor
Petit Mentor Endans
Petits Ilots
Pink Rock
South Row Island
Table Ronde
Cosmoledo Atoll:
Menai
Ile du Nord
Ile Nord-Est
Ile du Trou
Goëlettes
Grand Polyte
Petit Polyte
Grand Ile (Wizard)
Pagode
Ile du Sud-Ouest
Ile aux Moustiques
Ile Baleine
Ile aux Chauve-Souris
Ile aux Macaques
Ile aux Rats
Ile du Nord-Ouest
Ile Observation
Ile Sud-Est
Ilot la Croix
Astove Island
Assumption Island

Atlantic Ocean

Republic of Cape Verde
Boa Vista
Brava
Fogo
Maio
Sal
Santa Luzia
Santo Antão
São Nicolau
Santiago
São Vicente

Democratic Republic of São Tomé and Príncipe
Príncipe
São Tomé Island
Rolas

European dependencies and territories

France

Mayotte
Grande-Terre (Mayotte)
Petite-Terre (Pamanzi)
Chissioua Mtsamboro (Zamburu Island)

Réunion
Réunion

Îles Éparses

Bassas da India
Europa Island
Glorioso Islands
Juan de Nova Island
Tromelin Island

Italy

Pelagie Islands
Lampedusa
Linosa
Lampione

Pantelleria
Pantelleria

Spain

Canary Islands
Lanzarote
Fuerteventura, world's 237th largest island
Gran Canaria, world's 252nd largest island
Tenerife, world's 208th largest island
La Gomera
La Palma
El Hierro
Lobos Island
Chinijo Archipelago
Alegranza
La Graciosa (Graciosa Island)
Montaña Clara
Roque del Este
Roque del Oeste

Chafarinas Islands
Isla del Congreso
Isla de Isabel II
Isla del Rey

Alhucemas Islands
Peñón de Alhucemas
Isla de Tierra
Isla de Mar

Alboran Island
Isla de Alborán

Perejil Island
Isla de Perejil

Santa Catalina Island
Isla de Santa Catalina

Portugal

Madeira Islands
Madeira
Porto Santo
Desertas
Deserta Grande Island
Bugio Island
Ilhéu Chão
Cal Islet

Selvagens Islands (Savage Islands)
Northeast Group
Selvagem Grande Island
Ilhéu Sinho (Sinho Islet)
Palheiro do Mar
Palheiro da Terra
Southwest Group
Selvagem Pequena Island
Fora Islet
Ilhéu Grande

United Kingdom

Saint Helena
Saint Helena
Boatswain Bird Island
Tartar Rock
White Rock
Boatswain Bird Rock
Bates Rock
Ascension Island
Tristan da Cunha
Tristan da Cunha
Inaccessible Island
Nightingale Islands
Nightingale Island
Middle Island
Stoltenhoff Island
Gough Island

Other

Botswana
Sedudu
Kubu Island
Lekhubu Island
Madinari Island

Djibouti
Maskali Island
Moucha Island
Sept Freres, Djibouti

Equatorial Guinea
Annobón
Bioko (formerly Fernando Po)
Corisco
Elobey Grande
Elobey Chico

Eritrea
Dahlak Archipelago
Dahlak Kebir (formerly Dehalak Deset)
Harmil
Howakil
Nahaleg
Nora
Fatuma
Halib
Howakil Islands
Massawa Island

Guinea
Los Islands
Tombo Island

Guinea-Bissau
Bijagós Archipelago

Kenya
Lamu Island
Manda Island
Samuli Island

Liberia
Bushrod Island
Providence Island

Malawi
Chizumulu
Likoma

Mozambique
Angoche Island
Bazaruto Archipelago
Chiloane Island
Inhaca Island
Island of Mozambique
Primeiras and Segundas Archipelago
Quirimbas Islands
 Vamizi Island

Namibia
Albatross Island
Bird Island
Black Rock Island
False Plum Pudding Island
Flamingo Island
Halifax Island
Mercury Island
Impalila
North Long Island
Penguin Islands
Plumpudding Island
Pomona Island
Possession Island
Roastbeef Island
Seal Island
Shark Island
Sinclair's Island
South Long Island

Senegal
Gorée
Îles des Madeleines
Morfil

Sierra Leone
Banana Islands
Bunce Island
Sherbro Island (now Bonthe Island)
Turtle Islands

Somalia
Bajuni Islands
Addilo Island
Ambuu Island	
Bandarka Island	
Bangadini Island	
Bantaabsi Island	
Bavadi Island	
Bawaadi Island	
Bengadiiene island	
Biramlide Island
Koyama (island)
Saad ad-Din Islands
Aibat Island

South Africa
Dassen Island
Robben Island
Seal Island
Marion Island (Prince Edward Islands)

Sudan
Mukawwar Managed Nature Reserve
Suakin Archipelago National Park

Tanzania
Mafia Island
Nabuyongo Island
Pemba Island
Ukerewe Island
Zanzibar

Tunisia
Djerba (Jerba)
Galite Islands
Kerkennah Islands
Chergui Island
Gharbi, Tunisia
Zembra Island

Uganda
Sese Islands

See also

List of islands
List of islands in the Atlantic Ocean
List of islands in the Mediterranean
List of islands in the Indian Ocean

Africa
Islands